Grace Hoadley Dodge (May 21, 1856December 27, 1914) was an American philanthropist who was the first woman appointed a member of the New York Board of Education.

Early life
Grace was born in Manhattan on May 21, 1856.  She was the oldest of six children born to Sarah Tappan (née Hoadley) Dodge (1832–1909) and William Earl Dodge Jr. (1832–1903), a merchant devoted to religious and philanthropic works known as the "Christian Merchant".  Her younger siblings included William Earl Dodge III; Cleveland Hoadley Dodge; Mary Melissa Hoadley Dodge; Alice Clinton Hoadley Dodge (who married William Church Osborn); and Morris Jesup Dodge, who died young;

She was the granddaughter of U.S. Representative from New York William E. Dodge and the great-granddaughter of David Low Dodge.  Her grandfather William and her great-grandfather (William's his father-in-law), Anson Greene Phelps, formed the import firm of Phelps Dodge, which was one of the largest copper mining corporations in the United States, and created the family's vast wealth.  Her maternal grandfather was David Hoadley, the president of the Panama Railroad, and her great-grandfather was prominent architect David Hoadley.

Grace was mostly educated at home by private tutors, but also spent two years at Miss Porter's School in Farmington, Connecticut between 1872 and 1874. As a young woman, she taught Sunday school at the Madison Square Chapel and, later, at industrial schools for the Children's Aid Society.

Philanthropy
Throughout her life, and in death, Grace donated millions of dollars and years of service to philanthropic work.  She was instrumental in forming the Kitchen Garden Association, which became the Industrial Education Association. She was the main source of funds, and first treasurer, for the New York College for the Training of Teachers, which became Teachers College, and subsequently a school of Columbia University.

Committed to helping working girls, Dodge organized the first Working Girls Society among a group of silk workers in 1884. According to Dodge, the specific objectives of the Society were to "furnish pleasant rooms where its members can pass the evening; to organize classes for mutual enjoyment and improvement; to collect a circulating library for use of members; and to develop co-operative measures which shall be for the benefit of the members."

On February 16, 1885, eleven of the clubs in New York City united to form the Association of Working Girls' Societies, with Dodge as founder and driving force. She negotiated the merger of two opposing young women's groups into the Young Women's Christian Association (YWCA) of the United States. She also organized the Travelers Aid Society of New York in 1907 to protect female travelers from falling victim to vice, especially the so-called "white slave traffic" (the coercion of white women into prostitution). She had called for the creation of a National Travelers' Aid Society, but died before this could be accomplished.  The Grace Dodge Career and Technical Education High School, named in her honor, was located in the Bronx, New York. It closed its doors in 2015.

Personal life

Grace died at her family home, 262 Madison Avenue in Manhattan, on December 27, 1914.  Dodge left an estate valued at $6,977,747 of which $1,500,000 was bequeathed directly to religious, charitable, and educational institutions.  Among her estate was her home, known as Greystone, and various artworks, including a landscape painting by Homer Dodge Martin, a painting called The River of Light by Frederic Edwin Church (inherited from her father), a landscape with pool and cattle by James McDougal Hart, Valley, Hills, and Stream by Alexander Helwig Wyant, and A Girl with Basket and Pigeons.

Legacy
A biography of Grace H. Dodge was written by Abbie Graham, copyright 1926.

Family

References

External links
 
 ProQuest: Grace Hoadley Dodge: Women and the Emerging Metropolis
 Grace Hoadley Dodge
 The Grace Dodge Society at Teachers College
 Grace Hoadley Dodge papers at the Sophia Smith Collection, Smith College Special Collections

1856 births
1914 deaths
Dodge family
Miss Porter's School alumni
American philanthropists